is a railway station in the city of Fujioka, Gunma, Japan, operated by East Japan Railway Company (JR East).

Lines

Station layout

The station consists of two side platforms serving two tracks. The station is attended.

Platforms

History
The station opened on 1 July 1931. With the privatization of the Japanese National Railways (JNR) on 1 April 1987, the station came under the control of JR East.  The station became Suica-compatible from February 2002.

Passenger statistics
In fiscal 2019, the station was used by an average of 1138 passengers daily (boarding passengers only).

Surrounding area
 Fujioka City Hall
 Fujioka Tax Office

See also
 List of railway stations in Japan

References

External links

 JR East Station information 

Railway stations in Japan opened in 1931
Stations of East Japan Railway Company
Railway stations in Gunma Prefecture
Hachikō Line
Fujioka, Gunma